Liam Loughlan (born 24 April 2002) is an English footballer who plays as a midfielder.

Career
Loughlan was born in Leicester.

He started his career at the academy of Leicester City, playing for their under-18 team in the 2019–20 season. He joined Salford City's development squad during the summer of 2020, and made his competitive debut for the club on 9 September in a EFL Trophy game against Manchester United Under-21s. On 8 October 2021, he moved on loan to National League North team Farsley Celtic.  He was released by Salford at the end of the 2021–22 season.

Career statistics

Honours
Salford City
EFL Trophy: 2019–20

References

External links

2002 births
Living people
English footballers
Association football midfielders
Leicester City F.C. players
Salford City F.C. players
Farsley Celtic F.C. players
Footballers from Leicester